Sir Richard William Ground,  (2 May 1949 – 22 February 2014) was an English judge in the Cayman Islands and Bermuda.

Background
Ground was born in Stamford, England in 1949 and studied at Lincoln College, Oxford, Inns of Court School of Law. He was called to the bar at Gray's Inn in 1975. He was a media lawyer in London, before going to the Cayman Islands to serve as Crown Counsel from 1983 to 1987 and then as Attorney General of the Cayman Islands from 1987 to 1992.

He was Chief Justice of the Turks and Caicos Islands from 1998 to 2004, and Chief Justice of Bermuda from 2004 to 2012. Ground retired as Chief Justice in 2012 and was succeeded by Ian Kawaley.

He died on 22 February 2014 in Grindleford, Derbyshire, survived by his widow, Dace McCoy Ground, whom he married in 1986.

References

External links
Sir Richard William Ground, 2012 Knighthood approval in The Gazette

1949 births
2014 deaths
20th-century English judges
Knights Bachelor
Bermudian judges
Attorneys General of the Cayman Islands
Alumni of Lincoln College, Oxford
Alumni of City, University of London
Members of Gray's Inn
People from Stamford, Lincolnshire

Chief justices of the Turks and Caicos Islands
Chief justices of Bermuda
21st-century English judges